Väinö Johannes Meltti (12 March 1898 in Viipuri – 3 May 1964) was a Finnish journalist, educationist, and politician. He was a member of the Parliament of Finland in 1941 and again from 1944 to 1945. Between 1941 and 1944, he was in prison for political reasons. Meltti was originally a member of the Social Democratic Party of Finland (SDP). After he was freed from prison, he joined the Finnish People's Democratic League (SKDL) and the Socialist Unity Party (SYP), a member organisation of the SKDL. From 1946 to 1964, Meltti was Governor of Uusimaa Province.

References

1898 births
1964 deaths
Politicians from Vyborg
People from Viipuri Province (Grand Duchy of Finland)
Social Democratic Party of Finland politicians
Socialist Unity Party (Finland) politicians
Finnish People's Democratic League politicians
Members of the Parliament of Finland (1939–45)
Finnish people of World War II
Prisoners and detainees of Finland
University of Helsinki alumni